Whitcomb Heights is an unincorporated community in Sugar Creek Township, Vigo County, in the U.S. state of Indiana. It is officially part of West Terre Haute, Indiana. Whitcomb Heights is part of the Terre Haute metropolitan area.

Geography
The community of Whitcomb Heights is located on an eminence alongside State Road 150.

Community 
There are no commercial or industrial businesses located in the area. Atop the hill the community is located on are many cornfields and residential dwellings  . The tiny community is also home to a park known as Lee Fields Parks as tiny as the community is.

References

Unincorporated communities in Indiana
Unincorporated communities in Vigo County, Indiana
Terre Haute metropolitan area